Eva Ulrika Nyström (born 29 November 1999) is a Finnish footballer who plays as a centre-back for Hammarby IF in Damallsvenskan and the Finland national team.

Club career

PK-35 Vantaa
Born in Helsinki, Nyström started to play youth football with local club FC Viikingit, before moving to PK-35 Vantaa. In 2017, she made her senior debut for the club in the Kansallinen Liiga, the domestic top tier, making ten league appearances in total. The following season, in 2018, the club was crowned Finnish champions, with Nyström only playing 12 league games due to injuries.

AIK and Umeå IK
On 14 January 2019, Nyström signed a one-year contract with AIK, in the Swedish second division Elitettan. Throughout the year, she played 26 league games, scoring eight goals, although AIK missed out on a promotion by finishing 4th in the table.

On 28 November 2019, Nyström signed a two-year contract with Umeå IK in Damallsvenskan, Sweden's top tier, effective in January 2020. She went on to play 21 league games, scoring twice, but was unable to save the club from suffering a relegation.

Hammarby IF
On 4 December 2020, Nyström signed a two-year contract with Hammarby IF in Damallsvenskan, effective in January 2021. She established herself as a starting centre-back and enjoyed the team's style of play. Throughout the season, she made 21 league appearances, scoring once, helping her side to a 7th place in table.

In 2022, Nyström featured in 25 league games, scoring three goals. She regularly captained the side, as Hammarby finished 5th in the table. On 5 November 2022, Nyström signed a new three-year contract with the club.

International career
Nyström was called up to the senior Finnish national team for the first time for a UEFA Women's Euro 2022 qualifying Group E fixture with Scotland in October 2020. She made her national team debut on 16 February 2022, in a 0–5 away loss to France.

Personal life
Nyström is a self-confessed Manchester United supporter, and harbours ambitions of playing for their Women's Super League team.

References

1999 births
Living people
Finnish women's footballers
Women's association football defenders
PK-35 Vantaa (women) players
AIK Fotboll (women) players
Umeå IK players
Hammarby Fotboll (women) players
Kansallinen Liiga players
Elitettan players
Damallsvenskan players
Finland women's international footballers